Ovchiqal'acha is a jamoat in north-west Tajikistan. It is located in Ghafurov District in Sughd Region. The jamoat has a total population of 21,585 (2015). It consists of 9 villages, including Qal'acha (the seat).

History 
The jamoat has been hit with Kyrgyzstani shelling and drone strikes as part of the 2022 Kyrgyzstan-Tajikistan clashes, with the Tajikistani government claiming that Kyrgyzstani drones had struck a school and mosque in the jamoat.

Notes

References

Populated places in Sughd Region
Jamoats of Tajikistan